Legislative elections were held in El Salvador on 12 March 2000. Although the Nationalist Republican Alliance received the most votes, the Farabundo Martí National Liberation Front won the most seats. Voter turnout was 41.8%.

Results

References

Bibliography
Political Handbook of the world, 1997. New York, 1998. 

El Salvador
Legislative elections in El Salvador
Legislative